21 Black Futures is a Canadian film and theatre project, broadcast by CBC Gem in 2021. Created in conjunction with the Black Canadian theatre company Obsidian Theatre to mark both Black History Month and the 21st anniversary of Obsidian, the project commissioned 21 short film adaptations of theatrical monologues on the theme of "the future of Blackness" by Black Canadian writers, each performed by a Black actor on the stage of Meridian Hall in Toronto.

The project was commissioned in part because the COVID-19 pandemic in Canada had prevented the staging of a traditional theatre festival.

The project aired over three weeks in February 2021, with seven films premiering each week on February 12, 19 and 26.

Films

Awards

References

2021 Canadian television series debuts
2021 Canadian television series endings
CBC Gem original programming
2020s Black Canadian television series